African-American women have been practicing medicine informally in the contexts of midwifery and herbalism for centuries. Those skilled as midwives, like Biddy Mason, worked both as slaves and as free women in their trades. Others, like Susie King Taylor and Ann Bradford Stokes, served as nurses in the Civil War. Formal training and recognition of African-American women began in 1858 when Sarah Mapps Douglass was the first black woman to graduate from a medical course of study at an American university. Later, in 1864 Rebecca Crumpler became the first African-American woman to earn a medical degree. The first nursing graduate was Mary Mahoney in 1879. The first dentist, Ida Gray, graduated from the University of Michigan in 1890. It wasn't until 1916 that Ella P. Stewart became the first African-American woman to become a licensed pharmacist. Inez Prosser in 1933 became the first African-American woman to earn a doctorate in psychology. Two women, Jane Hinton and Alfreda Johnson Webb, in 1949, were the first to earn a doctor of veterinary medicine degree. Joyce Nichols, in 1970, became the first woman to become a physician's assistant.

This is an alphabetical list of African-American women who have made significant firsts and contributions to the field of medicine in their own centuries.

1800s 

A

Caroline V. Still Anderson set up a successful clinic and dispensary in Philadelphia.
B

Anna DeCosta Banks, who graduated nursing school in 1891, had a long and successful career as a nurse in both the 19th and 20th centuries.
Lucy Hughes Brown in 1894 became the first African American woman physician in North Carolina, and then later in the decade, the first in South Carolina.
Mary Louise Brown graduated from Howard University Medical School in 1898 and went on to do post-doctorate work in Edinburgh, Scotland.

C

Consuelo Clark-Stewart graduated from Boston University School of Medicine in 1884 and was the first African-American woman to practice in Ohio.
Rebecca Davis Lee Crumpler in 1864 was the first African-American woman to earn a medical degree in the United States.
 Rebecca J. Cole in 1867, became the second African-American woman to earn a medical degree in the United States.

D

Halle Tanner Dillon became the first woman licensed as a physician in Alabama.
Sarah Mapps Douglass became the first woman to complete a medical course of study at an American university in 1858 when she graduated from the Ladies' Institute of the Pennsylvania Medical University.
Juan Bennett Drummond, 1888 graduate of the Women's Medical College of Pennsylvania, became the first African American woman doctor licensed in Massachusetts.

E

Matilda Evans in 1897 becomes the first African American woman to earn a medical license in South Carolina.

F

Sara Iredell Fleetwood graduated from the Freedmen's Hospital Nursing Training School in 1896.
Louise Celia Fleming in 1891 became the first African American woman to enroll in the Women's Medical College in Philadelphia.
Martha Minerva Franklin graduated from nursing school in 1897 and worked to improve racial equality in nursing.
Sarah Loguen Fraser in 1879 became the first woman and African American to graduate from the Syracuse College of Medicine and became the fourth African American woman to become a doctor.

G

Artishia Garcia Gilbert in 1898 became the first African American woman to register as a licensed physician in Kentucky.
Ida Gray became the first African American woman to become a dentist when she graduated from the University of Michigan in 1890.
 Eliza Ann Grier in 1897 was the first African-American woman to practice medicine in the state of Georgia.
H

 Julia R. Hall in 1892 became the first African American woman to work as a resident in the gynecology clinic of Howard University.

J

Sarah Garland Boyd Jones in 1893 became the first woman physician licensed in Virginia.
Sophia B. Jones was a Canadian-born American medical doctor, who founded the nursing program at Spelman College. She was the first black woman to graduate from the University of Michigan Medical School and the first black faculty member at Spelman.

M

Mary Mahoney was the first African-American to graduate from nursing training, graduating in 1879.
Biddy Mason, a slave, worked as a midwife and later set up a day care and a nursery in Los Angeles.
Alice Woodby McKane created the first nurses training school in Georgia in 1893.
Verina Morton-Jones became the first woman to be licensed as a physician in Mississippi.

P

Georgia E. Lee Patton, an 1893 medical school graduate went on to practice medicine in Africa.
Beulah Wright Porter, in 1897 became the first African American woman physician in Indianapolis.

R

Sarah Parker Remond earned her medical license in 1871 in Italy.

S

Nannette Stafford, a 1878 medical school graduate from Howard University.
Susan Smith McKinney Steward in 1870 became the third African American woman to become a physician.
Ann Bradford Stokes in January 1863 was enlisted as a ships' nurse in the United States Navy.

T

Susie King Taylor, was the first African-American to serve as a U.S. Army Nurse in the Civil War.
Sojourner Truth worked as a nurse while she was enslaved. Later, she advocated for formal training.

W

 Emma Wakefield-Paillet in 1898 was the first African American woman physician in Louisiana.
Georgia E. L. Patton Washington in 1893 became the first woman to earn a medical degree from Meharry Medical College.
Alice Woodby McKane in 1892 earned her medical degree and later went on to open the first hospital in Monrovia, Liberia in 1895 with her husband, Cornelius McKane.

1900s 

#

25th Station Hospital Unit, an all African-American unit as part of the Army Nurse Corps, was the first black medical unit sent overseas during World War II.

A

Clara Adams-Ender in 1967 became the first woman to be awarded the United States Army's Expert Field Medical Badge.
Virginia Alexander was a public health official and physician in Philadelphia who founded the Aspiranto Health Home in 1931 for the poorest members of her community.
Ludie Clay Andrews became the first registered nurse in Georgia in 1920.

B

Margaret E. Bailey in 1970 became the first African American nurse to attain the rank of colonel in the United States Army.
Patricia Era Bath, first African American to complete a residency in ophthalmology.
Hattie Bessent in 1976 became the first African American to serve as graduate dean at Vanderbilt University Graduate School of Nursing.
Juliann Bluitt Foster became the first African American full-time faculty at the Northwestern University Dental School in 1967.
Etnah Rochelle Boutte was a pharmacist and the only African American woman elected to the New York City Cancer Commission in 1951.
Nancy Boyd-Franklin was named distinguished psychologist of the year by the Association of Black Psychologists in 1994.
Goldie D. Brangman-Dumpson was one of the surgical team at Harlem Hospital that saved Martin Luther King Jr. in 1958.
Clara Brawner was the only African American woman practicing medicine in the Memphis area in the mid 1950s.
Mary Elizabeth Britton in 1904 became the first African American woman licensed as a physician in Lexington, Kentucky.
Dorothy Lavinia Brown was the first African American woman working in general surgery residency in the Southern United States, where she started in 1948.
Zora Kramer Brown served on the National Cancer Advisory Board between 1991 and 1998 and was the first African American woman to hold that position.
Carrie E. Bullock, a Chicago nurse, worked to promote the  National Association of Colored Graduate Nurses (NACGN).
Prudence Burns Burrell was one of the small number of African American nurses in the Army Nurse Corps during World War II.

C

Barbara McDonald Calderon was the first public health nurse in Iowa.
Alexa Canady is the first African-American woman to become a neurosurgeon and practiced as a pediatric neurosurgeon.
Mary Elizabeth Carnegie, worked as a clinical instructor and dean of the nursing school of Florida A&M University.
Joye Maureen Carter in 1992 became the first African American ever in the United States,to hold the position of Chief Medical Examiner(in DC).
May Edward Chinn in 1926 became the first African American woman to hold an internship at Harlem Hospital.
Cora LeEthel Christian, who also worked in the Virgin Islands, became the first African American woman to earn her medical degree at Jefferson Medical College in 1971.
Donna Christian-Christensen, in 1997, is the first woman physician and first African-American physician to serve in the United States Congress.
Lillian Atkins Clark was chief resident at the Douglass Hospital in Philadelphia starting in 1924.
Mamie Phipps Clark was a psychologist who worked on research regarding black children and education.
Mattie E. Coleman in 1932, an African American physician, became the first graduate of the dental program at Meharry Medical College.
Anna Bailey Coles was the founding dean of Howard University's College of Nursing, created in 1969.
M. E. Thompson Coppin was the 10th African American woman to become a medical doctor in the United States.
Patricia Cowings was hired to work as a psychophysiologist at NASA in 1978.
Sadye Curry in 1972 became the first African American woman gastroenterologist.

D

Bessie Delany, who graduated from the Columbia University School of Dental and Oral Surgery in 1923 became the second African American woman to be licensed as a dentist in New York State.
Donna P. Davis in 1975 became the first African American physician in the US Navy.
Frances Elliott Davis in 1919 became the first African American nurse officially recognized by the American Red Cross.
Helen O. Dickens, in 1950 is the first African-American woman to become part of the American College of Surgeons.
Janice Douglas in 1984 became the first woman to hold the rank of professor of medicine at Case Western Reserve University School of Medicine.
Lillian Singleton Dove, who graduated from Meharry Medical College in 1917, may have been one of the first African American woman surgeons. She also wrote regular news columns about health in the Chicago Defender.
Georgia Dwelle in 1920, established the first general hospital for African Americans in Georgia.

E

Lena F. Edwards was a physician who helped low income and migrant workers. In 1964, she was the first African American woman to receive the Presidential Medal of Freedom.
Willarda V. Edwards is the first African-American woman to serve as the president of the Baltimore Medical Society.
Joycelyn Elders was the first African American appointed as Surgeon General of the United States in 1993.
Effie O'Neal Ellis in 1970 became the first African American woman to work as an administrator at the American Medical Association.
Anna Cherrie Epps in 1969 became the first African American woman to work as a professor at the Tulane University School of Medicine.
Roselyln P. Epps worked as a professor of pediatrics and child health at Howard University, starting in 1981.
Lydia Ashburne Evans was an early African American physician who worked in Chicago.

F

Dorothy Celeste Boulding Ferebee was a physician and civil rights activist.
Ella Mae Ferneil was the first African American registered nurse in the state of California.
Angelina Dorothea Ferguson, pediatrician and the first Associate Vice-President for Health Affairs at Howard University. She was also known for her work with sickle cell anemia.
Vernice Ferguson in 1981 was elected president of the American Academy of Nursing.
Debra Holly Ford became the first African American woman certified in colon and rectal surgery in 1996.
Justina Laurena Carter Ford in 1902 became the first African American woman to earn a medical license in Colorado.
Yvette Fay Francis-McBarnette graduated from Yale School of Medicine in 1950 and was the second African American woman admitted to the school.
Dolores Mercedes Franklin in 1974 becomes the first African American woman to graduate from the Harvard School of Dental Medicine.
Clara Frye was a nurse and inventor who received a patent for a combination bed and bedpan in 1907.

G

Jessie G. Garnett in 1919 became the first woman to graduate from Tufts Dental School.
Marilyn Hughes Gaston, in 1990 becomes the first black woman doctor appointed to the Health Resources and Services Administration's Bureau of Primary Health Care.
Wilina Ione Gatson in 1960 becomes the first African American graduate of the University of Texas nursing school.
Fannie Gaston-Johansson in 1998 earned full professorship and tenure at Johns Hopkins School of Nursing, the first African American woman to earn that position.
Helene Doris Gayle, in 1995 becomes the first woman and African-American appointed as Director of the National Center for HIV, STD, and TB Prevention at the US CDC.
Florence S. Gaynor becomes the first African American woman to "head a major teaching hospital" in 1971.
Mary Keys Gibson in 1907 became the first African American in the Southern United States to earn a nursing certificate.

H

Mamie Odessa Hale was nurse and teacher of midwives in Arkansas.
Beatrix McCleary Hamburg in 1948 became the first African American woman to graduate from the Yale School of Medicine.
Jean L. Harris in 1955 is the first African American woman to earn a medical degree from the Medical College of Virginia.
Jane Hinton in 1949 is one of the first of two African American women to become a doctor of veterinary medicine.
Lillian Holland Harvey was the Dean of the Tuskegee University School of Nursing for 30 years.
Eve Higginbotham in 1994 became the first African American woman chair of a department of ophthalmology in a university.
Sandra Cavanaugh Holley in 1988 became the first African American president of the American Speech-Language-Hearing Association.
Gertrude Cora Teixeria Hunter was the first director for Health Services for Head Start.

I

Eleanor Lutia Ison-Franklin was the first African American woman to earn a position as a "major administrative officer" at Howard University School of Medicine.

J

Alma N. Jackson in 1945 became the first African American woman commissioned as a nurse for the United States Public Health Service.
Anna Louise James, in 1908 was the first black woman to become licensed as a pharmacist in Connecticut.
Grace Marilynn James, in 1953 became one of two of the first African American women to serve on the faculty of a medical school in the American South.
Mildred Faye Jefferson in 1951 became the first African American woman to earn a medical degree from Harvard Medical School.
Mae C. Jemison, first African-American woman astronaut, is also a physician.
Renee Rosalind Jenkins in 1989 became the first African American president of the Society for Adolescent Medicine and in 2007, became the first African American president of the American Academy of Pediatrics.
Gladys L. Johnson in 1982 became the first African American woman oral and maxillofacial surgeon.
Linda Dianne Johnson in 1978 became the first African American woman optometrist in Mississippi.
Mattiedna Johnson played a role in curing scarlet fever in the 1940s.
Hazel W. Johnson-Brown in 1979 became the first African American chief of the Army Nurse Corps.
Edith Irby Jones in 1985 became the first woman to be elected as president of the National Medical Association.
K

 Elizabeth Lipford Kent in 1955 became the first African American nurse to earn a doctorate in public health.
Francis M. Kneeland established her own practice as a physician in Memphis, Tennessee in 1907.

L

Agnes D. Lattimer, pediatrician, did her residency at Cook County Hospital in 1960.
Margaret Morgan Lawrence was the first African-American woman to become a psychiatrist and psychoanalyst in the United States
Jemima Belle Lawson in 1920 became the first African American to earn the title of registered nurse in Bell County, Texas.
Nancy C. Leftenant in March 1948 became the first African American in the Regular Army Nurse Corps.
Vivian M. Lewis in 1959 became the first African American woman to earn a medical degree from the University of Oklahoma College of Medicine.
Diane Lindsay who served in the Army Nurse Corps became the first African American nurse to earn the Soldier's Medal for Heroism.
Ruth Smith Lloyd was the first African American woman to earn a doctorate in anatomy.
Myra Adele Logan in 1943 was the first woman to perform open-heart surgery.

M

Audrey Forbes Manley, in 1988, becomes the first African American woman to become the Assistant Surgeon General of the U.S.
Barbara Martin McArthur in 1976 created the first nurse epidemiology program in the US.
Pearl McBroom developed new ways of observing changes in coronary blood vessel tissue.
Ernest Mae McCarroll in 1946 became the first black physician to work at the Newark City Hospital.
Gertrude Elizabeth Curtis McPherson in 1904  became the first black woman to pass the New York State Board of Dentistry.
Mary E. Merritt became the first African-American licensed nurse in Kentucky.
Marie Metoyer became in 1951 the first African American woman to graduate as a medical doctor from Cornell University.
Jane Evelyn Mitchell, one of the first African American registered nurses in Delaware.
Mildred Mitchell-Bateman in 1962 became the first woman to head a state department of mental health.

N

Helen E. Nash helped integrate St. Louis Children's Hospital and worked on reducing infant mortality.
Joyce Nichols becomes the first woman educated formally as a Physician Assistant in 1970.
Eva M. Noles in 1940 was the first African American person to graduate from the E.J. Meyer Memorial Hospital School of Nursing.

O

Estelle Massey Osborne was the first African American to earn her masters degree in nursing.

P

Doreen P. Palmer was the first woman to head the gastroenterology department in a hospital.
Thelma Patten Law in 1955 was the first African American woman to enter the Harris County Medical Society.
Margaret M. Patterson-Townsend in 1992 opened the first successful sleep disorder clinic owned and operated by an African American woman.
Sarah Ewell Payton in 1962 became the first African American woman certified by the American Board of Radiology.
Rose Marie Pegues-Perkins was one of the first African American x-ray technicians.
Muriel Petioni in 1974 founded the Susan Smith McKinney Steward Medical Society for Women, professional organization for African American doctors.
Vivian Pinn in 1991 is the first woman appointed the director of the office of research on women's health at the National Institutes of Health.
Elinor Powell was a World War II nurse working for the Army who defied anti-miscegenation laws.
Inez Prosser in 1933 became the first African American woman to earn a doctorate in psychology.
Deborah Prothrow-Stith in 1987 became the youngest person and the first woman to serve as the Commissioner of Public Health in Massachusetts.

R

Della H. Raney became the first African American nurse in the Army Nurse Corps when she was accepted in 1941.
Rosalie A. Reed in 1973 became the first black veterinarian to work at a major zoo in the United States.
Theresa Greene Reed in 1968 became the first African American woman to work as an epidemiologist.
Estelle B. Richman in 1995 became the first African American woman to serve as Health Commissioner in Philadelphia.
Catherine Juanita Elizabeth Roett-Reid in 1951 became the first African American pediatrician in Houston, Texas.
Barbara Ross-Lee in 1993 becomes the first African-American woman appointed Dean of a medical school in the United States.
Mary Munson Runge in 1979 became the first African American to serve as the head of the American Pharmaceutical Association.

S

Jessie Sleet Scales became the first African American public health nurse in 1900 when she was appointed to the Tuberculosis Committee of the Charity Organization Society in New York.
Mabel Keaton Staupers worked to pressure the Army to admit black women into the Army Nurse Corps, which they finally did in 1941.
Velma Scantleburry-White is the first African-American female transplant surgeon in the United States
Rosalyn P. Scott in 1977 became the first African American woman trained in the practice of thoracic surgery.
Doris Shockley in 1955 became the first African American woman to earn a doctorate in pharmacology.
Omega Logan Silva in 1974 became the first African American person to work at the Department of Veterans Affairs as a Clinical Investigator.
Jeanne Craig Sinkford in 1975 becomes the first woman to serve as the dean of a school of dentistry.
Gloria R. Smith in 1983 became the first nurse appointed to the head of a state agency in Michigan.
Vada Watson Somerville in 1918 became the first African American woman to earn a Doctorate of Dental Surgery in California.
Jeanne Spurlock in 1971 became the first woman to receive the Edward A. Strecker M.D. Award.
Mabel Keaton Staupers worked to desegregate the nursing profession.
Ella P. Stewart in 1916 became the first black woman licensed as a pharmacist in both Pennsylvania and in the United States.
Florence Stroud became the first African American health directory for Berkeley University.

T

Natalia Tanner in 1946 became the first African American to do their residency at the University of Chicago.
Ruth Janetta Temple, a physician, worked in public health in Los Angeles.
 Claudia L. Thomas is the first female orthopedic surgeon in the United States
Debi Thomas in 1988 won an Olympic bronze medal for figure skating and in 1997, graduated from medical school.
Adah Belle Samuel Thoms earned her nursing degree in 1905 at the Lincoln Hospital and Home School of Nursing and went on to advocate for better opportunities for black nurses.
Yvonne Thornton in 1981 is the first African-American woman to become board certified in special competency in maternal-fetal medicine.

V

Yvonnecris Veal in 1989 became the first woman chair on the Board of Trustees for the National Medical Association.

W

Valerie O. Walker in 1994, became the first African American woman to serve on the Missouri Board of Registration for the Healing Arts.
Mary Fitzbutler Waring, a physician and clubwoman, served as the chair of the Department of Health and Hygiene for the National Association of Colored Women's Clubs (NACW).
Alyce Faye Wattleton in 1978 became the first African American to serve as president of the Planned Parenthood Federation of America.
Alfreda Johnson Webb in 1949 became one of the first of two African American women to earn a doctor of veterinary medicine.
Josie E. Wells in 1910 became the first African American woman teaching at Meharry Medical College.
Frances Cress Welsing, a psychiatrist who studied racism.
Doris Wethers, who graduated from Yale School of Medicine in 1952, was the third African American woman to graduate from the school.
Emma Rochelle Wheeler, graduated from Meharry Medical College in 1905 and helped create Walden Hospital.
Ionia Rollin Whipper, graduated from Howard University Medical School in 1903 and in 1931, created the Ionia R. Whipper Home for Unwed Mothers.
Betty Smith Williams in 1971 co-founded the National Black Nurses Association.
Geraldine Pittman Woods, in 1964, becomes the first African-American woman appointed to the National Advisory General Medical Services Council.
Minnie D. Woodward in 1913 was the first African American to earn a certificate of registration as a trained nurse in Tennessee.
Jane C. Wright, in 1967, becomes the Associate Dean and Professor of Surgery at New York Medical College.
Y

 N. Louise Young was the first African American woman practicing medicine in Maryland, beginning in 1933.

2000s 
B

Regina Marcia Benjamin, 18th United States Surgeon General, appointed in 2009.
Nadine Burke Harris becomes the first Surgeon General of the State of California in 2019.

E

Roselyn Payne Epps in 2002, is the first African American woman president of the American Medical Women's Association.

G

 Wallena Gould in 2015 becomes the first African American Certified Registered Nurse Anesthetist (CRNA) to become a fellow in the American Academy of Nursing (AAN).

H

Patrice Harris in 2018 is the first African American president elected to the American Medical Association.
Sharon Henry in 2000, becomes the first African American woman to become a fellow in the American Association for the Surgery of Trauma.

J

Michele Johnson, became the first woman and African American promoted to a full professorship of Radiology and Biomedical Imaging and of Neurosurgery at the Yale School of Medicine in 2014.
Paula A. Johnson is the first African-American president of Wellesley College, chairwoman of the Boston Public Health Commission, former professor at the Harvard T.H. Chan School of Public Health

O

Elizabeth O. Ofili in 2000 became the first woman to serve as president of the Association of Black Cardiologists.

R

Joan Reede became the first dean for diversity and community partnership at Harvard Medical School in 2001.

S

Jeannette E. South-Paul in 2001 became the first African American to serve as permanent department chair at the University of Pittsburgh department of family medicine.
W

 Karen Winkfield in 2005 became the second black woman to complete the medical scientist program at Duke University School of Medicine.

References

Sources 

Women in medicine
Lists of American women
Lists of health professionals

African-American nurses